Igor Vasylyovych Skuz (born 30 May 1976) is a Ukrainian professional racing driver currently competing in the Ukrainian Touring Championship since 2007 for a family-owned MasterKart Racing Team, that also has a role of main promoter of the series since 2018. Outside Ukraine he competed in Russian Touring Car Championship, European Touring Car Cup and TCR International Series.

Racing career

Karting
Skuz started his career in 1984 in karting and was competing there for more than twenty years. He was competing in Soviet and foreign championships with a good results. In 1990 he was nominated as a Master of Sport Candidate, he got his first championship title in 1994. In 2000 he won the Intercontinental class championship and got a title of the Master of Sport of Ukraine. He was racing alongside his older brother Oleg in their own team, called MasterKart. Igor won more than 200 karting races.

Ukrainian Circuit Racing Championship
In 2007 he planned switching to Ukrainian Circuit Racing Championship, where his older brother was already racing, but before that he entered the 2007 Dubai 24 Hour, driving an A1-class Ford Fiesta for Team Rhino's Leipert. His first ever touring car driving experience had resulted in second place in his class. In the Ukrainian championship he debuted in a U1600 class driving a Fiesta as well, now for the MasterKart team.

For the first two years the team was struggling in the series, that was completely new for them, despite the good qualifying times of Igor, in the races he was experiencing technical failures. In 2008 he drove in both S2000 and Touring Lite classes and achieved his first win. His first chance of winning the championship was in 2009, when he was fighting with Russian racer Aleksey Basov, who was already a champion in his country. He got one win, but in the next round he was involved in a big crash, so his car needed a body change. He failed his last chances, when his car got a technical failure in the next round, and when later the main venue for the championship, Autodrome Chaika, cancelled the final round of the season. In the final standings he was third.

ETCC and TCR International
In the next years Skuz finally started getting a stable performances, winning in his class in 2010. In 2011, alongside the Ukrainian championship he started competing in the European Touring Car Cup, driving a Ford Fiesta 1.6 16V for ATM Racing in the Super 1600 division, resulting fifth in the championship. In Ukraine he also to get his second championship title. That year he also appeared at the Russian Touring Car Championship rainy race at Moscow as a guest driver, driving his MasterKart Ford. He failed to get a good result, crashing in the first race and getting a penalty for ignoring yellow flag in the second one.

In the ETCC Skuz switched to the Super 2000 division for 2012, driving for Liqui Moly Team Engstler in a BMW 320si. However he switched to a SEAT León 2.0 TDI run by SUNRED Engineering for the remaining rounds of season. He got the fourth place in the European Cup and for the third time became a Champion of Ukraine.

In 2013 Skuz didn't get another championship title and finished the season fourth, after that he left the championship to focus on international racing. In the ETCC he switched to Campos Racing driving a SEAT León TFSI, in the new team he was seventh in the championship.

For 2014 Skuz stayed with Campos Racing, but switched to a Chevrolet Cruze 1.6T, he ended the season 3rd in the TC2T standings, having his first two victories. In March 2015, it was announced that Skuz would make his TCR International Series debut with Campos Racing driving an Opel Astra OPC, however after the first round of the championship he switched to a SEAT León Cup Racer. After a bad start of the year he switched to WestCoast Racing driving a Honda Civic TCR. He got only two finishes in points and left the series before the season ended.

Racing record

Complete European Touring Car Cup results
(key) (Races in bold indicate pole position) (Races in italics indicate fastest lap)

† Driver did not finish the race, but was classified as he completed over 90% of the race distance.

Complete TCR International Series results
(key) (Races in bold indicate pole position) (Races in italics indicate fastest lap)

References

External links
 

1976 births
Living people
Ukrainian racing drivers
European Touring Car Cup drivers
TCR International Series drivers
Campos Racing drivers
Engstler Motorsport drivers